11th arrondissement may refer to,
11th arrondissement of Paris, France
11th arrondissement of Marseille, France
11th arrondissement of the Littoral Department, Benin

Arrondissement name disambiguation pages